Gowganda/Gowganda Lake Water Aerodrome  was located on Gowganda Lake, Ontario, Canada.

References

Defunct seaplane bases in Ontario